Holonic-The Self Megamix is a 1997 mixtape by Japanese hip hop producer DJ Krush. It peaked at number 24 on the UK Independent Albums Chart.

Critical reception

Stewart Mason of AllMusic gave the album 4 stars out of 5, calling it "an excellent introduction to DJ Krush's work."

Track listing

Charts

References

External links
 

1997 mixtape albums
Debut mixtape albums
DJ Krush albums
Mo' Wax albums